Lactarius acrissimus is a member of the large milk-cap genus Lactarius in the order Russulales. Found in Benin, the species was described in 2003. It is found in savanna woodlands.

See also 
 List of Lactarius species

References

External links 
 

acrissimus
Fungi described in 2003
Fungi of Africa